Carol Raye  (17 January 1923 – 18 June 2022 as Kathleen Mary Corkrey and also billed as Carole Raye) was a British-born Australian actress of film, television, radio,  theatre and revue, comedian, singer, dancer, and radio and television producer and director, as well as a TV network assistant and media personality. Raye was one of the first female executives in Australia, at a time when the industry was dominated by male counterparts.

She was known for her career, spanning some seven decades from the late 1930s, firstly as a film star and theatre performer in the United Kingdom in which she would star, and often dance and sing, in such movies as Song of Romance, Strawberry Roan and Waltz Time, after which she briefly worked in Kenya, before immigrating to Australia, where she became notable for her small screen roles.

Raye was best known as the producer and original star of the iconic TV satire The Mavis Bramston Show alongside Gordon Chater and  Barry Creyton, as well as a semi-regular star of soap opera Number 96 as Baroness Amanda von Pappenburg, a wealthy socialite from Heidelberg, Germany, who regularly arrives at the iconic "96" to visit her nephew Don Finlayson, portrayed by Joe Hasham.

As a notable media personality, she also appeared as herself on programs like The Mike Walsh Show and was a regular panellist on the game show Blankety Blanks and as a honoured guest on This Is Your Life.

Early years
Raye was born in Rotherhithe, south east, London, England, the daughter of Royal Navy commander Reuben B. Corkrey and Ethel McGlashan, an accomplished pianist. The family travelled extensively, including stays in Bermuda and Malta, until her father was stationed at the Portsmouth Navy Base.

Ray's early ambition was to become a dance teacher, and she trained in ballet and ballroom at the Southsea School of Dance. Raye took her first stage role in No, No, Nanette in 1938, and was discovered the following year by Australian-born choreographer and producer Freddie Carpenter, now operating a dance academy in Soho, who further trained her in dance.

Carpenter suggested her for a tour of musical comedy Bobby Get Your Gun and was also instrumental in creating her stage name, which he depicted as being to Difficult for Marquee Purposes, the press to spell and audience to remember. She made her professional debut opposite Bobby Howes and Bertha Bellmore at the Manchester Opera House in 1939.
 
Her breakthrough stage role came only months later, in the production Funny Side Up at His Majesty's Theatre, which marked her London debut.

Career in Britain

British film star and theatre performer
Raye began her career in her native United Kingdom with starring roles in films including Song of Romance, which was the first British musical film shot in technicolor, Strawberry Roan  by Maurice Elvey,

However it was the musical romance Waltz Time by Paul Stein, as Empress Maria that  launched her international screen career, that year in April, publicity lead her to the United States  and a stage production in the role lead role in Bonanza Bound!, after which she turned down a multi year Hollywood contract, deciding return to London, where she subsequently appeared in features including Spring Song directed by Montgomery Tully and two films directed by John Harlow, Green Fingers and While I Live and several telemovies for the BBC.

Raye also played lead roles in many musicals and television productions in her native Britain. Her theatre roles included Tough at the Top, Fun and Games, and  The Merry Widow, Dear Miss Phoebe and The Ticket-of-Leave Man.

Work in Kenya
Raye having remarried in 1951, and with her husband being offered by the British Government, the opportunity to run a 1000-acre farm in the oversea's Kenya Colony, the family settled in Navaisha Town, in the West of Mombasa. Whilst in Kenya, two filmmakers offered here the lead role in there film No Rain in Timbura., which would be the first feature produced in that country. she worked briefly as a producer/director and on-screen talent for the Kenya Broadcasting Corporation from 1961 to 1964, making her one of the first faces on British East African television.

Career in Australia

Mavis and 96
The family having emigrated to Australia in 1964, Raye was given a letter by introduction by the BBC, to the ABC Charles Moses, who in turn recommended her to the Seven Network CEO James Oswin at Sydney station ATN-7, where she took a position working as network assistant to the General Manager, it was here she devised the idea of creating a satirical television series, based on revue at the Phillip Street Theatre and the British TV series The Week That Was. Starting in November 1964, the network gave the green light for the now iconic The Mavis Bramston Show, in which Raye would also star as one of 3 originals along with Gordon Chater and Barry Creyton.

Raye also produced the pilot episode and co-produced the series (with Michael Plant), until her departure from the programme in late 1965. She resumed work on the series for the 1967 and 1968 final seasons.

Raye played the ongoing comedy role of much-married socialite and Baroness Amanda von Pappenburg, in the 1970's, the aunty of Don Finlayson (played by Joe Hasham) whom she visits from Heidelberg, Germany, in the top-rated soap opera Number 96.  After two substantial stints with the series in the 1973–74 period, Amanda was permanently written out of the serial, but Raye remained  with the serial, switching to the role of creative director for the show's producers. That busy role involved the casting of regular characters, along with reviewing the scripts and storylines.
 
With there having been a fictional Baroness character on the series, fittingly the real Duke of Bedford and his wife appeared as guests on the show.

Other TV shows
In 1976-77, Raye acted in the medical soap opera The Young Doctors, playing the guest role of Rosalie Parker. She acted in television and film roles through the 1990s, and into the 2000s, with appearances in SeaChange and in commercials.

Theatre
In the early 1980s, Raye had a four-year appointment with the Theatre Board of the Australia Council. 
 
She appeared in many Australian theatre productions, including California Suite, Pleasure of His Company, Travelling North, The Merry Wives of Windsor, You Can't Take It With You, Noises Off, and Hay Fever. Raye was a subject of This Is Your Life.
 
Raye retired in 2000, subsequently she campaigned Seven Network boss Kerry Stokes to release a DVD of "Mavis", although in a release to DVD of Number 96, she provided an audio commentary alongside film and TV critic Andrew Mercado, co-star Elisabeth Kirkby, and The Honourable Michael Kirby.

Marriages
On 3 November 1945, Raye married U.S. Army Engineer Captain Clark Spencer, a "prominent Winchester and Marblehead sportsman" (Massachusetts, USA).

In 1951, she married prominent veterinarian Robert Ayre Smith (1926-2006). They had three children, two of whom followed their mother into theatrical roles. Her eldest child, Sally Ayre Smith, is a former television producer, best known for the ABC series SeaChange, but is now a director of an organic farm produce marketing business. Her youngest daughter, Harriet, started her career in the Sydney Theatre Company office and is also an occasional actress.

Honours
Raye was honoured in the 2022 Commonwealth of Australian Queens Birthday Honours List, with an appointment to the Member of the Order of Australia (AM), with the citation  For services to the arts as an actress and producer.

Filmography

Television

Appearances

References

External links

 

1923 births
2022 deaths
20th-century British actresses
20th-century Australian actresses
Actresses from London
Australian satirists
Australian stage actresses
Australian television actresses
Australian women comedians
British emigrants to Australia
Members of the Order of Australia
Logie Award winners
21st-century Australian women
21st-century Australian people
20th-century English women
20th-century English people